The Blomberg B is a 2-axle bogie that was introduced by EMD in 1939 with the FT locomotive series; the original "B" version plus later "M" and "X" versions were quite successful and became standard equipment on a multitude of locomotive models. They are easily identified by prominent "swing hangers" on each side which widen the effective spring base and provide a better ride. EMD literature refers to this truck as the "2 Axle Outside Swing Hanger;" informally it is named after EMD designer Martin Blomberg; this design evolved as an abbreviation of the preceding 3-axle design from the E-units; see  filed on Jan 29, 1938 and granted on Feb 6, 1940. As of 2022 Blomberg B trucks are common sights under operating locomotives throughout North America.

B version
The "B" version is the original 1939 design. EMD Blomberg B trucks are seen on other makers' locomotives; this occasionally resulted when buyers of new GE locomotives preferred trade-in EMD trucks and/or motors, instead of GE standard equipment.

M version
The M version (meaning "modified") was introduced in 1972 with the EMD Dash 2 locomotive series; it is also used on later models such as the GP50, GP60, F40PH and F59PH, as well as the MPI MPXpress.

X version
The X version (from "express") was introduced in 2007 with the MPI MPXpress locomotive series; its formal model is MPI 2237. This version directly evolved from the Blomberg M, but is longer and thus not rebuilt from older Blomberg frames.

See also
 Bogie
 Flexicoil suspension

References

Bogie